Fred Knipscheer (born September 3, 1969 in Fort Wayne, Indiana) is an American retired professional ice hockey player who played 28 games in the National Hockey League with the Boston Bruins and St. Louis Blues between 1993 and 1996. The rest of his career, which lasted from 1993 to 2000, was spent in the minor leagues.

Early life
A native of Fort Wayne, Indiana grew up playing junior hockey at R. Nelson Snider High School. He attended to St. Cloud State University and played for the St. Cloud State Huskies for three seasons. During the 1992–1993 season, he scored 34 goals in 36 games and was voted on to the WCHA first all-star team and the NCAA West Second All-American Team.

Career 
Knipscheer was signed by the Boston Bruins signed him as a free agent and played eleven games for the team during the 1993–1994 season. Knipscheer scored three goals but spent most of the year with the Providence Bruins of the American Hockey League. He scored 63 points in Providence and played a 16-game recall in Boston.

Early in the 1995–1996 season, Knipscheer was traded to the St. Louis Blues for veteran defenseman Rick Zombo. He only played one NHL game that year and returned to the minors, where he remained through the 1999–2000 season.

After retiring from hockey, Knipscheer started a hospitality holding group and became the managing partner of two restaurants in Indianapolis. He also coaches youth hockey and founded a company that produces CBD products.

Career statistics

Regular season and playoffs

Awards and honors

References

External links
 

1969 births
Living people
American men's ice hockey centers
Ice hockey players from Indiana
Boston Bruins players
Cincinnati Cyclones (IHL) players
Indianapolis Ice players
Kentucky Thoroughblades players
Milwaukee Admirals players
Omaha Lancers players
Phoenix Roadrunners (IHL) players
Providence Bruins players
St. Cloud State Huskies men's ice hockey players
St. Louis Blues players
Sportspeople from Fort Wayne, Indiana
Undrafted National Hockey League players
Utah Grizzlies (IHL) players
Worcester IceCats players
AHCA Division I men's ice hockey All-Americans